Robin David Brown (born 11 March 1951) is a former Zimbabwe cricketer, playing seven One Day Internationals between 1983 and 1987.

Coaching career
Brown acted as Zimbabwe's assistant coach with the team during the 2007 World Cup. On 28 August 2007 Brown was appointed the national coach of Zimbabwe, taking over from Kevin Curran.

Within two weeks Zimbabwe had beaten Australia in the 2007 ICC World Twenty20 tournament. However, a year later Brown was told by Zimbabwe Cricket that his 12-month contract would not be extended beyond that, and Walter Chawaguta, the former Zimbabwe Under-19 coach, took charge of the national team in August 2008. In 2012 he was appointed head of cricket development by Cricket Kenya and then interim national team coach.

References

External links

1951 births
Living people
Sportspeople from Kadoma, Zimbabwe
Zimbabwean people of British descent
White Zimbabwean sportspeople
White Rhodesian people
Zimbabwe One Day International cricketers
Zimbabwean cricketers
Rhodesia cricketers
Cricketers at the 1983 Cricket World Cup
Cricketers at the 1987 Cricket World Cup
Coaches of the Kenya national cricket team
Coaches of the Zimbabwe national cricket team
Zimbabwean cricket coaches